The Fort Pitt Incline was a  gauge funicular railroad in the Bluff neighborhood of Pittsburgh. The designer was Samuel Diescher. 

The incline was abandoned on 7 November 1900, and afterward sat idle for about three years before fire destroyed it.

Marking the former path of the incline are public steps which ascend from the south portal of the Armstrong Tunnel (at the South Tenth Street Bridge) to the Boulevard of the Allies next to the Duquesne University campus.

See also 
 List of funicular railways
 List of inclines in Pittsburgh

References

10 ft gauge railways in the United States
Railway inclines in Pittsburgh
Defunct funicular railways in the United States
Railway lines opened in 1882
1882 establishments in Pennsylvania
1900 disestablishments in Pennsylvania